Lyroda is a genus of square-headed wasps in the family Crabronidae. There are more than 20 described species in Lyroda.

Species
The genus Lyroda contains 26 extant species:

 Lyroda aethiopica Kohl, 1894
 Lyroda alaminos Tsuneki, 1983
 Lyroda argenteofacialis (Cameron, 1889)
 Lyroda aurea Mawadda and Girish Kumar, 2021
 Lyroda binghami Tsuneki, 1983
 Lyroda centralafricana Schmid-Egger and Al-Jahdhami, 2021
 Lyroda concinna (F. Smith, 1856)
 Lyroda errans (R. Turner, 1936)
 Lyroda fasciata (F. Smith, 1856)
 Lyroda formosa (F. Smith, 1858)
 Lyroda fukuiensis Tsuneki, 1983
 Lyroda laguna Tsuneki, 1983
 Lyroda madecassa Arnold, 1945
 Lyroda michaelseni W. Schulz, 1908
 Lyroda minima R. Turner, 1936
 Lyroda nigra (Cameron, 1904)
 Lyroda nuda Mawadda and Girish Kumar, 2021
 Lyroda philippinica Tsuneki, 1983
 Lyroda queenslandensis R. Turner, 1916
 Lyroda salai Giner Marí, 1945
 Lyroda salalah Schmid-Egger and Al-Jahdhami, 2021
 Lyroda subita Say, 1837
 Lyroda tridentata T. Li, W. Cai & Q. Li, 2009
 Lyroda triloba Say, 1837
 Lyroda venusta Bingham, 1897
 Lyroda williamsi Tsuneki, 1983

References

Crabronidae
Articles created by Qbugbot